Riding Down from Bangor may refer to:

Riding Down from Bangor (song), words written by Louis Shreve Osborne in 1871
Riding Down from Bangor (essay), 1946  essay by George Orwell